TAM Airlines Flight 3054 (JJ3054/TAM3054) was a regularly scheduled domestic passenger flight of TAM Airlines from Porto Alegre to São Paulo, Brazil.  On the evening of July 17, 2007, the Airbus A320-233 serving the flight overran runway 35L at São Paulo during moderate rain and crashed into a nearby TAM Express warehouse adjacent to a Shell gas station. The plane exploded on impact, killing all 187 passengers and crew on board and 12 people on the ground. The crash surpassed Gol Transportes Aéreos Flight 1907 as the deadliest aviation accident in Brazilian territory and in South American history, and remains the deadliest aviation accident involving the A320 proper worldwide, and the second-deadliest air disaster involving the A320 family, surpassed by the bombing of Metrojet Flight 9268, an A321-231, which crashed in Egypt in October 2015 with 224 fatalities.

The accident was investigated by the Brazilian Air Force's Aeronautical Accidents Investigation and Prevention Center (CENIPA), with a final report issued in September 2009. CENIPA concluded that the accident was caused by errors committed by the pilots during the landing at São Paulo.

Background

Congonhas runway refit 

On both of Congonhas's airport runways (35L/17R and 35R/17L), a slope prevented the drainage of accumulated water on the asphalt. It was already smooth because of excess rubber caused by tire pressure during landing. There were no runway end safety areas, as at the end of runways 35L and 35R was Avenida Washington Luís (a busy avenue), as well several buildings and houses. On July 24, 2006, less than a year before the accident, a Boeing 737 of BRA Transportes Aéreos experienced difficulty stopping on runway 35L, but the pilots were able to bring the aircraft safely to a stop by performing a ground loop. Due to delays and flight cancellations caused by rains in early 2007, Infraero (the company that manages Congonhas airport) decided to resurface the asphalt on the airport's main runway. Channeling grooves were planned to reduce the risk of hydroplaning. The works were completed on June 29, but without the grooves. Infraero stated that applying them would take another 30 days. While the Congonhas runway was under renovation, the 2006–07 Brazilian aviation crisis continued to advance, meaning that the runway was open for use despite the incomplete refit.

Landing difficulties 
On July 16, the day before the crash, four pilots who landed at the airport reported poor braking, including a TAM pilot, who managed to stop his aircraft just a few metres before the end of the runway. Between 12:25 pm and 12:28 pm, Infraero suspended operations at the airport to examine the runway conditions, and cleared it after reporting "no puddles and water slides." At 12:42 local time the same day, Pantanal Linhas Aéreas Flight 4763, an ATR 42-300, hydroplaned after touching down on runway 17R. The aircraft veered to the left, struck a concrete box and a small light pole, and entered the grass between the runway and taxiway. All 25 people aboard survived with no injuries, but the aircraft was damaged beyond repair and written off. Despite the incident, landings continued to be carried out normally at the airport.

Aircraft and crew

The aircraft operating as Flight 3054 was a twin turbofan Airbus A320-233, serial number 789, registration PR-MBK; it was powered by two IAE V2500 engines. It was built in 1998 and had been operated by other airlines before entering service with TAM in January 2007, six months before the accident. The aircraft was owned by Pegasus Aviation and had flown more than 21,000 hours over 10,000 cycles before the crash.

The aircraft was dispatched with the thrust reverser on the starboard engine deactivated, as it had jammed. TAM said in a statement a fault in a reverser "does not jeopardize landings" and no mechanical problem had been recorded on July 16, the day before the accident. The aircraft had no difficulty braking on the same runway a day before the fatal accident.

There were six crew members and 181 passengers on board. All 6 crew members as well as 171 of the passengers were Brazilian; the 12 remaining passengers were of various other nationalities. The flight crew consisted of two captains (rather than the usual captain and first officer): Captain Henrique Stefanini Di Sacco (53), and Captain Kleyber Aguiar Lima (54). There were also four flight attendants, with an additional 13 deadheading. Both pilots had been flying for over 30 years. Stefanini had logged 13,654 flight hours in his career (including 2,236 hours on the Airbus A320), and Lima 14,760 hours, with 237 of them on the Airbus A320.

Flight chronology

Several players and coaches from the Grêmio football club were initially booked on Flight 3054, intending to catch a connecting flight in Congonhas and fly to Goiânia, for a game scheduled against the Goiás Esporte Clube. However, the club's management rescheduled the trip to the next day. The plane departed from Salgado Filho International Airport in Porto Alegre at 17:18 Brazilian Standard Time (BRT) (20:18 UTC). It climbed to flight level (FL) 340. At 18:48 BRT (21:48 UTC), the flight made its landing at Congonhas-São Paulo Regional Airport.

Crash

Flight 3054 was cleared to land at Congonhas's Runway 35L. The runway is elevated above the surrounding area, and the aircraft's momentum carried it over traffic on the adjacent Avenida Washington Luís, a major thoroughfare, and crushed a four-story TAM Express facility, resulting in a large fire. The TAM Express facility contained offices and a warehouse, and was located adjacent to a Shell gas station. All 187 passengers and crew aboard died and the aircraft was destroyed.

The runway had recently been resurfaced, and did not yet have water-channeling grooves cut into it to reduce the danger of hydroplaning.

Flight Data Recorder (FDR) information recovered after the crash and released by Brazilian authorities showed that immediately prior to touchdown, both thrust levers were in CL (or "climb") position, with engine power being governed by the flight computer's autothrottle system. Two seconds prior to touchdown, an aural warning, "retard, retard", was issued by the flight's computer system, advising the pilots to retard the thrust lever to the recommended idle lever position. This would disengage the autothrottle, with engine power then governed directly by the thrust levers.

At the moment of touchdown, the spoiler lever was in the "ARMED" position. According to the system logic of the A320's flight controls, in order for the spoilers to automatically deploy upon touchdown, not only must the spoiler lever be in the "ARMED" position, but both thrust levers must be at or close to the "idle" position. The FDR transcript shows that immediately after the warning, the flight computer recorded the left thrust lever being retarded to the rear-most position, activating the thrust reverser on the left engine, while the right thrust lever (controlling the engine with the disabled thrust reverser) remained in the CL position. One theory put forth by CENIPA is that the pilots may not have noticed that the right engine remained at CL because the Airbus autothrottle system, unlike other aircraft manufacturers, does not automatically move the levers when the autothrust controller changes engine settings. Therefore, the pilots may have thought that the right engine was at idle power without realizing that Airbus autothrust logic dictates that, when one or more of the thrust levers is pulled to the idle position, the autothrust is automatically disengaged. Thus, when the pilot pulled the left engine thrust lever to idle, it disconnected the autothrust system and the computer did not retard the right engine power to idle. The A320's spoilers did not deploy during the landing run, as the right thrust lever was above the "idle" setting required for automatic spoiler deployment. Since the right engine thrust lever was still in the "climb" detent at that time, the right engine accelerated to climb power while the left engine deployed its thrust reverser. The resulting asymmetric thrust condition resulted in a loss of control and a crash ensued.

Timeline 
Source:

Congonhas

Aviation safety in Brazil had been under increased scrutiny following the mid-air collision in September 2006 over the Amazon of Gol Transportes Aéreos Flight 1907 and an Embraer Legacy 600 (see Brazil's 2006-2007 aviation crisis). Congonhas was singled out for having safety issues relating to operations in wet weather due to its location and runway characteristics for the traffic it serves.

Both airports receive the same type of traffic — ranging from small private planes to Boeing 737s and A320s. Many variables affect the landing distance of an aircraft, such as approach speed, weight and the presence of either a tailwind or a headwind. For an Airbus A320, a landing speed of  higher than normal can result in as much as a 25% increase in the runway length needed to stop an aircraft. Wet weather can also significantly reduce the braking performance of aircraft, leading to an increase in the minimum runway length requirement.

Pilots have called Congonhas airport the "aircraft carrier," because of the runway's short length and because pilots are told to go-around if they overshoot the first  of runway.

In June 2007, a Brazilian judge briefly banned flights using Fokker 100, Boeing 737-700 and Boeing 737-800 aircraft in and out of the airport. The Airbus A320 was not among the aircraft banned, due to its manufacturer-stated braking distance being shorter than those of the banned aircraft. Pilots had complained that water had been accumulating on the runway, reducing aircraft braking performance and occasionally causing planes to hydroplane. The judge claimed the runway needed to be  longer for these aircraft to operate safely. At the time, a spokeswoman from Brazil's National Civil Aviation Agency claimed "The safety conditions of the runway and the airport as a whole are adequate." TAM also objected to the decision, with a spokesman stating "If the injunction stands, it will cause total chaos," claiming over 10,000 passengers per day would be inconvenienced.

Aftermath
The airport reopened on July 19, 2007, using an alternative runway.

Many flights, including all OceanAir and BRA Transportes Aéreos, were transferred to Guarulhos International Airport, the major airport in São Paulo, due to the closure of the main runway at Congonhas and the ongoing investigation of the accident.

On July 20, Presidency Chief of Staff Dilma Rousseff announced plans to significantly reduce the number of flights operating at Congonhas. The plan included banning, within 60 days, all connection, stopover, charter, and international flights and the reduction in the number of private jets. The airport would only operate direct flights to certain cities in Brazil. The plan also called for a study of the expansion of São Paulo's two current airports and the construction of a third airport in the metropolitan area.

State crime scene investigators terminated the search for remains on July 28, 2007; as of that date, 114 bodies recovered from the site had been identified by the São Paulo Medical Examiner's Office as those of passengers.

Investigation

The investigation was carried out by Brazil's Aeronautical Accidents Investigation and Prevention Center (CENIPA). Data from the flight data recorder and cockpit voice recorder (CVR) were downloaded by the National Transportation Safety Board (NTSB) in the United States commencing July 20 and 23 respectively. Based on preliminary data from the FDR, on July 25 Airbus cautioned A320 operators to ensure that both thrust levers are set to idle during flare. The transcript of the CVR was released on August 1. It shows that the pilots were aware of the wet runway conditions and the deactivated thrust reverser. The pilots' comments suggest that the spoilers did not deploy and that they were unable to slow the aircraft. Crew error had not been ruled out.

An investigation by the Brazilian Public Safety Ministry released in November 2008 concluded that the pilots mistakenly left the lever for the right engine to climb upon landing, due to a mistake in landing procedures with the right thrust reverser being disabled from a prior maintenance, when in fact it was necessary to retard both engines in order for the spoilers to work. They also said that the National Civil Aviation Agency should have closed the airport on the night the plane landed because of heavy rains; that Congonhas airport authorities shared the blame because its runway had not been properly constructed with grooves to drain away excess rainwater, contributing to the crash;   that the plane's manufacturer, Airbus, should have provided alarms warning the pilots that the braking system was failing; and that TAM failed to properly train its pilots, who did not act correctly in the emergency.

Final report
In September 2009, more than two years after the accident, CENIPA announced the results of official investigations. The report shows that one of the thrust levers, which control engines, was in position to accelerate when it should be in idle, but it was not proved if there was mechanical or human failure as the cause of the accident.

The report suggests two hypotheses for the accident. In the first, there was a flaw in the power control of the plane's engines, which would have kept one of the thrust levers into acceleration, regardless of their actual position. This scenario would implicate mechanical failure of the aircraft as the cause of the accident. The likelihood of this failure occurring is calculated at once per 400 billion flight hours, and therefore highly improbable. In the second hypothesis, the pilot has performed a procedure different from that provided in the manual, and put the thrust lever in an irregular position. This scenario would implicate human error as the cause of the accident.

In addition to the positions of the thrust levers, the report points to several factors that may have contributed to the accident, such as a high volume of rain on the day, with the formation of puddles on the runway, as well as the absence of grooving. The report does not blame the length of the runway for the accident. The BEA also cleared Airbus of any misdoing because they had proposed a system warning modification regarding the incorrect thrust lever positions that TAM had rejected.

Response

After the crash, President Luiz Inácio Lula da Silva ordered three days of national mourning.

During the 2007 Pan American Games in Rio de Janeiro, the Brazilian athletes wore a black armband in remembrance of the victims. The flags of all participating countries were flown at half mast on July 18. Matches involving a Brazilian athlete or team started with a minute of silence.

All matches of the Campeonato Brasileiro 2007 started with a minute of silence, while all players wore black armbands. Brazilian Formula One driver Felipe Massa had a black stripe on top of his helmet during the 2007 European Grand Prix, to commemorate the victims. Rubens Barrichello also had stripes on his helmet, and the two Red Bull Racing drivers David Coulthard and Mark Webber had small Brazilian flags on their helmets referring to the accident.

More than 5,000 Brazilians marched to the crash site on July 29, 2007, blaming their government's failure to invest in airport infrastructure for the crash. Many of the protesters also demanded the ousting of President Luiz Inacio Lula da Silva.

International reactions 
: President Néstor Kirchner called president Lula to express condolences.
 : President Michelle Bachelet called president Lula to offer her condolences.
 : President Hu Jintao expressed his condolences to the Brazilian government as well as the friends and families of the victims. 
  : President Horst Köhler sent a telegram to President Lula expressing his condolences to the families of the victims. According to a statement at the German embassy in Brasilia reported, Germany would join the three-day mourning by lowering the flag at half-mast at the embassy.
 : Former president Vicente Fox expressed his condolences.
 : President Alan Garcia expressed his condolences and requested to talk with president Lula.
 : Felipe VI of Spain was in Brazil at the time of the accident and expressed condolences.
 : President George W. Bush, his spokesman Sean McCormack, and secretary of state Condoleezza Rice all expressed their condolences. Rice also called Brazilian Foreign Minister Celso Amorim to express additional condolences.
 : Odilo Scherer, the Archbishop of São Paulo, received a telegram from Pope Benedict XVI signed by the Vatican's secretary of state Tarcisio Bertone, expressing condolences as well as a mass for the victims.
 : Foreign minister Nicolás Maduro expressed his condolences to Brazil's government and citizens.

Memorial 

On July 17, 2012, the fifth anniversary of the accident, a plaza named Memorial Square was opened. There is a memorial with the names of the victims engraved as well as a mulberry tree that survived the crash. There is another memorial in Porto Alegre called "Largo da Vida," where 199 trees have been planted. The memorial is located near Salgado Filho International Airport (the airport from which Flight 3054 departed).

Legal action
On November 19, 2008, the 13,600-page police investigation was completed, which took 16 months of research to produce, during which 336 people were heard. Federal prosecutors were of the opinion that the former director of the National Civil Aviation Agency (ANAC), Denise Abreu (who had taken up the post in March 2006), and the flight safety officer of the airline, Marco Aurelio dos Santos de Miranda, should both be convicted of attempt on air transport security in willful mode.

In 2011, the Brazilian Federal Public Ministry (Ministério Público Federal—MPF) laid criminal charges against Denise Abreu, the director of the Brazilian National Civil Aviation Agency (ANAC) at the time of the disaster, as well as two former TAM directors—Marco Aurélio dos Santos de Miranda, director of flight safety, and Alberto Fajerman, vice president of operations.  They were accused of neglecting air transport safety by allowing the aircraft to land in heavy rain on the notoriously short, recently resurfaced runway before cutting of grooves to channel away excess rainwater. The trial began in São Paulo in 2013. In 2014, MPF withdrew the charges against Fajerman, for lack of evidence.  A second charge against Abreu of "documentary falsehood" was dismissed in November, 2014.  As of March 2015, no judgement had been handed down on the other charges.

In 2014, TAM's insurer Itaú Seguros, the company responsible for paying compensation for the tragedy, launched a lawsuit in Brazil against Airbus for R$350 million (US$156.2 million), according to Folha de S. Paulo.  Attorneys representing Airbus responded in a Brazilian court filing that Airbus accepts no responsibility, laying the blame for the disaster with the cockpit crew, the airline and the poor state of the runway.

Notable victims
Among the victims were:
 Júlio Redecker (aged 51), a Brazilian Social Democracy Party federal politician, member and leader of the opposition in the Chamber of Deputies of Brazil.
 Paulo Rogério Amoretty Souza (aged 61), former chairman of the football team Sport Club Internacional and attorney for Sport Club Corinthians Paulista.
 Márcio Rogério de Andrade (aged 35), former football player and FIFA agent at the time of the crash. His spouse, his daughter and his brother-in-law also died in the disaster.

Dramatization
The Discovery Channel Canada / National Geographic TV series Mayday featured the crash and investigation in a Season 11 episode titled Deadly Reputation (alternatively Nightmare Runway and Disaster Runway), which included interviews with accident investigators and a dramatic recreation of the accident.

See also

 Philippine Airlines Flight 137 – Another Airbus A320 that crashed nine years earlier under almost identical circumstances, with 3 fatalities
 S7 Airlines Flight 778 – An Airbus A310 that crashed one year earlier also with a deactivated thrust reverser
 TAP Air Portugal Flight 425

References

Bibliography

External links

 CENIPA
Final Report (Archive)
Final Report  (Archive)
 TAM Airlines
Comunicados TAM   (Press releases from TAM regarding the incident) (Archive)
TAM Informa (Material from TAM Airlines about the incident)
 Bureau of Enquiry and Analysis for Civil Aviation Safety
Accident in São Paulo on 17 July 2007 (Archive)
Accident survenu à São Paulo le 17 juillet 2007  (Archive)

 Press Release - German Federal Bureau of Aircraft Accident Investigation  (Archive)
 
 Cockpit Voice Recorder transcript and accident summary
 In pictures: Brazil plane crash (BBC)
 Video from Congonhas airport security camera, comparing a normal landing with TAM flight 3054's landing 
 The World's Worst Airline  - Elizabeth Spiers
 Plane Crashes in Brazil
 List of passengers on Flight 3054 (Archive)
Photographs  (Archive)

Airliner accidents and incidents caused by weather
2007 disasters in Brazil
21st century in São Paulo
Aviation accidents and incidents in 2007
Airliner accidents and incidents caused by pilot error
Aviation accidents and incidents in Brazil
Airliner accidents and incidents involving runway overruns
TAM Airlines accidents and incidents
Accidents and incidents involving the Airbus A320
Articles containing video clips
July 2007 events in South America